Mikel Justin Cagurangan Baas (born 16 March 2000) is a Filipino professional footballer who plays as a center back for Malaysia Super League club Melaka United and the Philippines national team.

Club career

Youth
Raised in Netherlands, Baas had his youth career at Always Forward, Volendam, and AZ.

Jong AZ
In 2018–19 season, Baas was promoted to the B-team of AZ. Baas made his debut with Jong AZ as a substitute, replacing Léon Bergsma at the 90th minute of the match in a 1–2 away victory against TOP Oss.

Ratchaburi Mitr Phol
In September 2020, Baas joined Ratchaburi Mitr Phol, mid-season of the 2020 Thai League 1 which was temporarily suspended due to the COVID-19 pandemic. He signed a three-year contract with the club.

International career
Baas was born in Philippines and raised in Netherlands to a Dutch father and a Filipino mother, making him eligible to play for Netherlands or the Philippines. He initially chose Netherlands as he was a U-15 national team member playing a total of 3 games scoring 1 goal.

Philippines U-22 Olympic
Baas was part of the Philippines U-22 Olympic squad that competed in the 2019 Southeast Asian Games held in the Philippines. On the second group match on 27 November, he scored the Philippines' only goal in a 2–1 loss to Myanmar.

Philippines
Baas received his first call-up for the Philippines senior team in August 2019 when he was named in the squad for the 2022 FIFA World Cup qualifiers against Syria and Guam. On 10 September, the 19-year-old Baas made his senior debut in a 4–1 away win against the latter.

References

External links

 

2000 births
Living people
Filipino footballers
Citizens of the Philippines through descent
Philippines international footballers
Dutch footballers
Netherlands youth international footballers
Eerste Divisie players
Jong AZ players
Dutch people of Filipino descent
Filipino people of Dutch descent
Association football midfielders
Association football defenders
Competitors at the 2019 Southeast Asian Games
Southeast Asian Games competitors for the Philippines